The Cleethorpes Coast Light Railway is a  minimum-gauge railway that primarily serves holidaymakers in Cleethorpes, North East Lincolnshire, England. It operates from near the Cleethorpes Leisure Centre, running to the mouth of the Buck Beck.

History

The CCLR began as the Cleethorpes Miniature Railway in 1948, and ran for a distance of  near the sea front in Cleethorpes. The line was extended at both ends in 1972: the northern terminus was relocated slightly closer to the town centre, while at its southern end it now ran as far as the Zoo.

It became the Cleethorpes Coast Light Railway when it was privatised in 1991, and the new company renamed the termini Kingsway and Witts End. Witts End (located at zoo, which by this time had closed to visitors) was abandoned in 1994, and a new southern terminus was built at Meridian (now Lakeside).

In the 1960s, the line used battery locomotives. On being regauged in the 1970s, two Rio Grande steam outline locomotives built by Severn Lamb were used. Since being taken into private ownership, a variety of steam and diesel locomotives have been used, followed by petrol-driven engines with a steam outline, though genuine steam locomotives are now in operation. A National Lottery grant enabled the railways supporter association to acquire stock from the long-dismantled Sutton Miniature Railway in Sutton Park, Sutton Coldfield, including Bassett-Lowke Class 10 Little Giant 'Mighty Atom.'

The railway held the Olympic Torch on Day 39 of the 2012 Olympic Torch relay with BMR locomotive 'Mountaineer' hauling the Alan Keef 'Council Rake' carriages from Kingsway station to Lakeside station.

The railway was sold to Cleethorpes Light Railway Limited in May 2014  and celebrated its 70th anniversary in July 2018.

Present operations
Trains run from Cleethorpes Kingsway station, next to Cleethorpes Leisure Centre, over a  viaduct and along the sea wall, turning SSW to run past the sheds to the intermediate main station named Lakeside.

The Humberston section of the line has been closed to the public since the 2019 running season due to level crossing upgrades.

Stations
Cleethorpes Kingsway: Original station dismantled in 1998 and the current station built and opened in 1999 with a viaduct over the boating lake on way into the station. Station building houses a gift shop.
Discovery Halt: No longer in use, but platform exists, accessed by means of footpath alongside.
Lakeside: The main terminus with engine sheds and workshops, passing loop and on the platforms a cafe, multi-function space and the Signal Box Inn 'The Smallest Pub on the Planet'.
Humberston: Opened in 2007, features a signal box. (currently closed to the public)

Operations
There is only one operational timetable for the 2022 season. The first train departs Lakeside Station at 10:30 and runs every thirty minutes between Lakeside and Kingsway Station. Special timetables are put in place on special event days and busy periods throughout the season.

Steam locomotives

Locomotives which have worked on the railway but have since left are listed in Cleethorpes Coast Light Railway timeline.

References

Sources

Further reading

External links

Cleethorpes Coast Light Railway Official Website
The railway in Miniature Railway World
The railway and its predecessors in Miniature Railway World Blog
The railway in Geoffs Pages
Images of the railway past and present in flickr
Images of the railway from 2001 to the present in Dave's Rail Pics
One-time resident loco Haigh Hall in Narrow Gauge Heaven

Heritage railways in Lincolnshire
15 in gauge railways in England
Miniature railways in the United Kingdom
Cleethorpes